was a sushi restaurant run by Japanese chef  in the Ginza neighbourhood of Tokyo, Japan. It received a three-star rating in the 2011 edition of the Michelin Guide for Tokyo, Yokohama and Kamakura. Described as "Japan's most difficult restaurant to make a booking at", the restaurant closed in February 2013 so that Araki could pursue a new challenge overseas, which led to him opening The Araki in London in October 2014. In March 2019, Araki moved to Hong Kong to open another restaurant and was replaced at The Araki in London by Marty Lau. While The Araki had three Michelin star ratings, it was stripped of all three stars in the 2020 guide.

The restaurant is known for its seafood influenced cuisine, as well as for staying true to Japanese culture and traditions with a lot of the staff wearing traditional Japanese clothes. The restaurant is at the higher end of the price scale, with the average cost being around £300 per person.

See also
 List of Michelin starred restaurants
 List of sushi restaurants
 "The Araki" – in London

Further reading

References

Michelin Guide starred restaurants in Japan
Restaurants in Tokyo
Sushi restaurants in Japan
Defunct Japanese restaurants
Defunct restaurants in Japan